This is a list of the main career statistics of Italian professional tennis player Roberta Vinci.

Performance timelines

Only main-draw results in WTA Tour, Grand Slam tournaments, Fed Cup and Olympic Games are included in win–loss records.

Singles

Doubles

Significant finals

Grand Slam finals

Singles: 1 (runner-up)

Doubles: 8 (5 titles, 3 runner-ups)

WTA Premier Mandatory & 5 finals

Doubles: 12 (5 titles, 7 runner-ups)

WTA career finals

Singles: 15 (10 titles, 5 runner–ups)

Doubles: 43 (25 titles, 18 runner-ups)

ITF Circuit finals

Singles: 11 (9 titles, 2 runner–ups)

Doubles: 14 (9 titles, 5 runner–ups)

Junior Grand Slam finals

Doubles: 1 (title)

Record against other players

Record against top 10 players 
Vinci's match record against players who have been ranked in the top 10, with those who have been ranked No. 1 in boldface

 
  Dominika Cibulková 6–3
  Daniela Hantuchová 4–3
  Lucie Šafářová 4–3
  Sara Errani 4–6
  Flavia Pennetta 4–6
  Ana Ivanovic 4–6
  Petra Kvitová 3–4
  Nadia Petrova 3–3
  Svetlana Kuznetsova 3–4
  Ekaterina Makarova 3–3
  Jelena Janković 3–5
  Ai Sugiyama 2–0
  Karolína Plíšková 2–1
  Angelique Kerber 2–3
  Maria Kirilenko 2–3
  Caroline Wozniacki 2–4
  Simona Halep 2–5
  Agnieszka Radwańska 2–8
  Barbora Krejčíková 1–0
  Eugenie Bouchard 1–0
  Jelena Dokic 1–0
  Jelena Dokic 1–0
  Timea Bacsinszky 1–1
  Marion Bartoli 1–1
  Alicia Molik 1–1
  Andrea Petkovic 1–1
  Nicole Vaidišová 1–1
  Samantha Stosur 1–2
  Anastasia Myskina 1–2
  Patty Schnyder 1–3
  Francesca Schiavone 1–4
  Carla Suárez Navarro 1–4
  Serena Williams 1–4
  Vera Zvonareva 1–5
  Justine Henin 0–1
  Garbiñe Muguruza 0-1
  Elena Dementieva 0–2
  Amélie Mauresmo 0–2
  Maria Sharapova 0–3
  Kim Clijsters 0–3
  Victoria Azarenka 0–4
  Li Na 0–4
  Venus Williams 0–5
  Dinara Safina 0–5

No. 1 wins

Top 10 wins

Team competition
 2006, 2009, 2010 and 2013 Fed Cup

See also
 Italy Fed Cup team
 Italy at the 2004 Summer Olympics
 Italy at the 2008 Summer Olympics
 Sara Errani career statistics

References

External links
 
 
 

Tennis career statistics